Louis Pelletan was Governor General of Pondicherry in 1902, during the Second French Colonial Empire under Third Republic.

References
 Governors of French India in Declaration of the French Government on the Subject of French India (1947)

French colonial governors and administrators
Governors of French India
People of the French Third Republic